Colors Super Kids is a 2018 Tamil-language children's reality television show airing on Colors Tamil from 24 February 2018 and 20 May 2018 on Saturday and Sunday at 20:00 (IST). on every Monday to Friday at 21:30 (IST). The show presents the children's extraordinary talents and first 10 episodes were hosted by Shiva and the rest 16 episodes by Mirchi Vijay.

References

External links
 Colors Tamil Official Facebook in Tamil
 Colors Tamil Official Youtube Channel in Tamil

Colors Tamil original programming
Tamil-language reality television series
Tamil-language children's television series
Tamil-language talk shows
2010s Tamil-language television series
2018 Tamil-language television series debuts
Tamil-language television shows